PCCC may refer to:

 Clandestine Colombian Communist Party
 Parallel concatenated convolutional code, a code used in UMTS
 Passaic County Community College, a community college in New Jersey
 Peoria Charter Coach Company, a bus company in Illinois
 Permanent Commission of the FIDE for Chess Compositions (sometimes called just Permanent Commission for Chess Compositions)
 Prairie Capital Convention Center, a convention center in Springfield, IL, United States
 Primary, Community and Continuing Care, a section of the Irish Health Service Executive
 Programmable Controller Communication Commands, a network protocol employed in some industry control networks
 Progressive Change Campaign Committee, a political action committee in the United States
 Providence Continuing Care Centre, one of the three university hospitals in Kingston, Ontario